Death-inducer obliterator 1 is a protein that in humans is encoded by the DIDO1 gene.

Function 

Apoptosis, a major form of cell death, is an efficient mechanism for eliminating unwanted cells and is of central importance for development and homeostasis in metazoan animals. In mice, the death inducer-obliterator-1 gene is upregulated by apoptotic signals and encodes a cytoplasmic protein that translocates to the nucleus upon apoptotic signal activation. When overexpressed, the mouse protein induced apoptosis in cell lines growing in vitro. This gene is similar to the mouse gene and therefore is thought to be involved in apoptosis. Alternatively spliced transcripts have been found for this gene, encoding multiple isoforms.

References

Further reading

External links 
 

Transcription factors